Il pleut sur Bruxelles (It rains on Brussels) is a 1981 song by Dalida in memory of Belgian singer Jacques Brel, who died three years earlier. The song was featured on her album Olympia 81 and also released as a single, with Et la vie continuera as B-side. The song was written by Jeff Barnel and Michel Jouveaux.

Lyrics

The lyrics make reference to various characters and locations from Brel's songs, particularly Jef, Mathilde, Ces Gens-Là, Amsterdam, Marieke, Les Flamandes, Vésoul, Titine, Madeleine, J'Arrive, Jojo, La Fanette, Fernand and Jacky. The song title refers to Brel's song Bruxelles, but could also be a nod to Il neige sur Liège (It snows on Liège).

Sources

1981 songs
1981 singles
Dalida songs
Songs about Belgium
Songs about musicians
Commemoration songs
Brussels in fiction
Cultural depictions of Jacques Brel